Loughborough United F.C. were an English football club based in Loughborough, Leicestershire, that played in the Midland League.

References

Loughborough United Website

 
Defunct football clubs in England
Defunct football clubs in Leicestershire
Sport in Loughborough
Midland Football League (1889)